Knee Deep in the Hoopla is the debut studio album by American AOR band Starship, the succeeding musical project to Jefferson Starship. It was released on September 10, 1985, through record label Grunt.

Four singles were released from the album: the No. 1 hits "We Built This City" and "Sara", "Tomorrow Doesn't Matter Tonight" (No. 26 US Hot 100) and "Before I Go" (No. 68 US Hot 100).

Content 
AllMusic retrospectively described Knee Deep in the Hoopla as the Jefferson Airplane/Jefferson Starship/Starship project's "most overtly commercial effort to date".

The track "Desperate Heart", written by Michael Bolton and Randy Goodrum, also appears on Bolton's album Everybody's Crazy, released the same year. Two songs sung by Grace Slick were recorded for but left off the album: Slick's own "Do You Remember Me?" (released on The Best of Grace Slick) and the Peter Wolf–Jeremy Smith composition "Casualty" (included as a bonus track on the 1999 remaster). Jeannette and Pete Sears wrote a song for the album called "One More Innocent", but it was rejected for its political lyrics.

Cash Box said of the track "Tomorrow Doesn't Matter Tonight" that "Mickey Thomas’ sensational lead vocal keeps this cut aloft with exhilerating sonic flight" and that "It slices like a double bladed sword, and backed by searing rock guitars and a churning rhythm."  Billboard called that song "exemplary American AOR of the '80s, interrupted only by an ethereal bridge."

Release 

Knee Deep in the Hoopla was released on September 10, 1985, through record label Grunt.

Four singles were released from the album: the No. 1 hits "We Built This City" and "Sara", "Tomorrow Doesn't Matter Tonight" and "Before I Go".

The album was certified platinum by the RIAA.

Reception 

Knee Deep in the Hoopla received a negative response from professional music critics.

Track listing

Personnel
 Mickey Thomas – lead (1-3, 5-7, 9) and backing (1, 4, 8, 9) vocals
 Grace Slick – lead (1, 4, 8, 9) and backing (1, 5, 6, 9) vocals
 Craig Chaquico – lead guitar (all but 6), rhythm guitar (all tracks), backing vocals (5-7)
 Pete Sears – bass guitar (4, 5-7), backing vocals (5-7)
 Donny Baldwin – drums (4), backing vocals (1, 5-8)

Additional personnel
 Peter Wolf – keyboards, synthesizers (all tracks), LinnDrum programming (all but 4)
 Les Garland – DJ voice (1)
 Peter Beckett, J. C. Crowley, Siedah Garrett, Ina Wolf – backing vocals (3)
 Kevin Dubrow – backing vocals (4)
 Dave Jenkins – backing vocals (5)

Love Rusts backing vocals
 Peter Beckett
 J. C. Crowley 
 Siedah Garrett
 Ina Wolf
 Simon Climie 
 Lorraine Devon
 Phillip Ingram 
 Martin Page
 Chris Sutton
 Oren Waters 

Production
 Peter Wolf – producer, arrangements
 Jeremy Smith – producer, engineer
 Dennis Lambert – executive producer
 Skip Johnson – production coordinator
 Bill Thompson – manager
 Bill Bottrell – mixing engineer (1)
 Tom Size – additional engineering
 Paul Ericksen, Dana Chappelle, David Luke, Maureen Droney – assistant engineers.
 Stephen Marcussen – mastering engineer
 Raess Design (Ted Raess) – art, design
 Bill Robbins – photography 
 Recorded at The Plant Studios (Sausalito, CA); The Music Grinder (Los Angeles, CA).
 Mixed at Fantasy Studios (Berkeley, CA).
 "We Built This City" re-mixed at The Soundcastle, L. A.
 Mastered at Precision Lacquer (Los Angeles).

Singles
"We Built This City" (1985)
"Sara" (1986)
"Tomorrow Doesn't Matter Tonight" (1986)
"Before I Go" (1986)

Charts

Weekly charts

Year-end charts

Certifications

References

External links 

 
 Starship: Too Old to Rock?, Los Angeles Times

1985 debut albums
Grunt Records albums
RCA Records albums
Starship (band) albums
albums produced by Peter Wolf